The Museum of Modern Art Equatorial Guinea (Spanish: Museo de Arte Moderno de Guinea Ecuatorial) is a modern art museum in Malabo, the capital city of Equatorial Guinea.

The museum displays contemporary and traditional artworks from the continent of Africa.

See also
 List of museums in Equatorial Guinea

References

External links
 Museum of Modern Art Equatorial Guinea website

Museums with year of establishment missing
Museums in Equatorial Guinea
Modern art museums
Malabo